Bertholdia trigona, or Grote's bertholdia, is a species of moth in the family Erebidae. The species was first described by Augustus Radcliffe Grote in 1879. It is prevalent in the southwestern United States.

In studies performed at Wake Forest University, these moths were shown to have developed the ability to disrupt the echolocation of bats. This insect is the only known species that can jam its predator's echolocation.

References

External links

Corcoran, Aaron. SonarJamming.com. Sensory and Movement Ecology Lab at UC Colorado Springs.

Phaegopterina
Moths described in 1879